The Selawik River is a stream,  long, in the northwestern part of the U.S. state of Alaska. Originating in the Purcell Mountains near the Zane Hills, it flows generally west through the Selawik National Wildlife Refuge to Selawik Lake, which empties into the Kotzebue Sound in the Chukchi Sea.  The river is approximately at the latitude of the Arctic Circle.

The village of Selawik is along the river near its mouth.  The river is used for subsistence fishing by residents and for rafting and sport fishing by tourists.

See also
List of rivers of Alaska

References

Rivers of Alaska
Rivers of Northwest Arctic Borough, Alaska
Rivers of Yukon–Koyukuk Census Area, Alaska
Rivers of Unorganized Borough, Alaska
Wild and Scenic Rivers of the United States